Kårdal Station is a railway station in Aurland, Norway, on the Flåm Line. The station opened on 16 June 1946. It is the station that traditionally served the farm furthest up in the valley of Flåmsdalen. Because the station is located on a gradient, only trains heading downhill can stop at the station. The 2015 - 16 Flåmsbana timetable lists the station as disused.

References
Bibliography

Notes

Railway stations on the Flåm Line
Railway stations in Aurland
Railway stations opened in 1946
1946 establishments in Norway